DZNL (783 AM) Aksyon Radyo is a radio station owned by Manila Broadcasting Company through its licensee Philippine Broadcasting Corporation and operated by Montilla Multimedia Management and Marketing Services. The station's studio and transmitter are located along National Highway, Brgy. Pagdalagan Norte, San Fernando, La Union.

Established in 1964, DZNL is the pioneer AM station in La Union. It was formerly known as Radio Nalinac owned by the Zandueta Family. At that time, it was formerly affiliated with the Radio Mindanao Network. In the early 1980s, it was sold to Manila Broadcasting Company.

References

Radio stations in La Union
Radio stations established in 1964